Herochroma flavibasalis is a moth of the family Geometridae first described by William Warren in 1894. It is found in Sundaland. The habitat consists of lowland and lower montane forests.

References

Moths described in 1894
Pseudoterpnini
Moths of Asia